The 2014–15 CONCACAF Champions League championship stage was played from February 24 to April 29, 2015. Eight teams competed in the championship stage to decide the champions of the 2014–15 CONCACAF Champions League.

Qualified teams
The winners of each of the eight groups in the group stage qualified for the championship stage.

Seeding
The qualified teams were seeded 1–8 in the championship stage according to their results in the group stage.

Format
In the championship stage, the eight teams played a single-elimination tournament. Each tie was played on a home-and-away two-legged basis. The away goals rule would be used if the aggregate score was level after normal time of the second leg, but not after extra time, and so a tie would be decided by penalty shoot-out if the aggregate score was level after extra time of the second leg.

Bracket
The bracket of the championship stage was determined by the seeding as follows:
Quarterfinals: Seed 1 vs. Seed 8 (QF1), Seed 2 vs. Seed 7 (QF2), Seed 3 vs. Seed 6 (QF3), Seed 4 vs. Seed 5 (QF4), with seeds 1–4 hosting the second leg
Semifinals: Winner QF1 vs. Winner QF4 (SF1), Winner QF2 vs. Winner QF3 (SF2), with winners QF1 and QF2 hosting the second leg
Finals: Winner SF1 vs. Winner SF2, with winner SF1 hosting the second leg

Quarterfinals
The first legs were played on February 24–26, and the second legs were played on March 3–5, 2015.

|}

All times U.S. Eastern Standard Time (UTC−5)

First leg

Second leg

3–3 on aggregate. Montreal Impact won on away goals.

Alajuelense won 6–4 on aggregate.

América won 5–0 on aggregate.

Herediano won 3–1 on aggregate.

Semifinals
The first legs were played on March 17–18, and the second legs were played on April 7–8, 2015.

|}

All times U.S. Eastern Daylight Time (UTC−4)

First leg

Second leg

4–4 on aggregate. Montreal Impact won on away goals.

América won 6–3 on aggregate.

Finals

The first leg was played on April 22, and the second leg was played on April 29, 2015.

|}

All times U.S. Eastern Daylight Time (UTC−4)

First leg

Second leg

América won 5–3 on aggregate.

References

External links
CONCACAF Champions League , CONCACAF.com

3